Hemanta may refer to:

Hemanta (season), season of winter in the Hindu calendar
Hemanta (film), a 2016 Bengali language film
Hemanta Mukherjee metro station, a metro railway station in Kolkata, India

People with the given name
Hemanta Bahadur B.C., Nepalese politician
Hemanta Dora, Indian football player
Hemanta Dutta, Indian director and dramatist
Hemanta Kalita, Indian politician
Hemanta Kumar Sarkar (1897–1952), Indian author and publisher
Hemanta Mishra (born 1945), Nepalese wildlife conservator and author
Hemanta Mukherjee (1920–1989), Indian musician and singer
Hemanta Sena, ruler of the Sena dynasty 1070–1096
Hemanta Vincent Biswas (born 1995), Bangladeshi footballer

See also
Hemant, an Indian male given name, including a list of people with the name
Hemanth (disambiguation), a variation of the name Hemant, including a list of people with the name
Hemantha, a Sinhalese male given name, including a list of people with the name